Bridge International Academies is a Kenyan company which provides for-profit education to children in India, Kenya, Nigeria and Uganda. It was started in 2008, and calls itself a "social enterprise".

History

Bridge opened a London, UK office.

In 2016, Bridge opened six schools in Andhra Pradesh, India in a partnership with the Government of Andhra Pradesh to use disused school buildings to create Bridge schools.

Bridge won the 2016 Global Shared Value award in Kenya.

Costs for bridge schools net losses and revenues are estimated and are not released by the firm, with losses in 2016 estimated $12m a year and with a total revenue of $16m / year.

In 2017, the number of Bridge academies in Lagos, Nigeria increased. Bridge removed pupils after taking control of schools with large class sizes, and removed 74% of incumbent teachers from their schools.

Structure

Bridge is managed through a centralised system in each country, lowering the administrative costs for operating individual schools. Each Bridge school has only one administrative staff member, known as an Academy Manager, headteacher or Principal, who manages the school through a smartphone loaded with a custom-developed application that connects managers to a central cloud-based server.

The rate of teacher absenteeism for Bridge schools is documented at less than 1%, whereas in Kenyan public schools according to World Bank research, absenteeism in the classroom is 47.3%.

Awards
 In 2012, Africa Awards for Entrepreneurship for Outstanding Small and Growing Business Award by the African Leadership Network.
 In addition to both being named on the CNBC Next List 2014.
 In 2015, WISE (World Innovation Summit in Education) Award
 Economist Innovation Award
 Overseas Private Investment Corporation Development Impact Award
 Fast Company World's Top 10 Most Innovative Companies
 Featured in a report by the Brookings Institution, Center for Universal Education entitled Millions learning: Scaling up quality education in developing countries.
 African Business Employer of Choice Award 2018
 ACQ5 Award: Education Company of the Year (Africa)

Criticism

Bridge has received criticism from different sources, including teaching unions and education rights groups. Education groups have pushed back on Bridge as using a model that stifles creativity, innovation, and goes against educational research in developed countries. Critics have been accused of putting 'ideology before education'.

After the president of the World Bank Jim Yong Kim praised Bridge Schools in 2015, there was a large push-back from organisations in Kenya and Uganda, disagreeing with his statement. They expressed deep concern over the global financial institution's investment in a chain of private primary schools targeting poor families in Kenya and Uganda and called on the institution to support free universal education instead.

Others have argued that their model, focused on guided instruction, actually enhances creativity similar to the way musicians use sheet music or actors have scripts.

The company has come under criticism from aid agencies and civil rights groups, including ActionAid and Education for All, for being detrimental to the plan of offering a “universal, free and compulsory basic education” to all children. Education International (EI), a global group of teachers’ unions, has criticised Bridge for its for-profit model being “morally wrong.” 

Global Justice Now has criticised Bridge by suggesting that “the cost per student at just $6 dollars a month” is misleading. It states that 'the suggestion that $6 is an acceptable amount of money for poor households to pay reveals a profound lack of understanding of the reality of the lives of the poorest”. Global Justice Now calculated that for half their populations, the $6 per month per child it would cost to send  three primary school age children to a Bridge Academy, is equal to at least a quarter of their monthly income. Many families already struggle to provide three meals a day to their children. It has also claimed that the real total cost of sending one child to a Bridge school is between $9 and $13 a month, and up to $20 when including school meals.

Funding and investors

Bridge has received funding from a number of investors, including: 
 Bill & Melinda Gates Foundation
 Commonwealth Development Corporation
 Department for International Development
 International Finance Corporation
 Kholsa Ventures
 New Enterprise Associates
 Omidyar Network
 Overseas Private Investment Corporation
 Chan Zuckerberg Initiative
 Pershing Square Foundation

References

Education companies established in 2008
Companies based in Nairobi
Social enterprises
Education companies of Kenya